William Goodison may refer to:
 William Goodison (politician)
 William Goodison (surgeon)